Rudolf Klabouch (born 29 October 1929) is a Czechoslovak sprint canoeist who competed in the 1950s. He was born in Prague. Competing in two Summer Olympics, he earned his best finish of sixth in the K-2 10000 m event at Melbourne in 1956 with Miroslav Jemelka in Melbourne and Bedřich Dvořák in Helsinki.

References
Rudolf Klabouch's profile at Sports Reference.com

External links
  

1929 births
Canoeists at the 1952 Summer Olympics
Canoeists at the 1956 Summer Olympics
Czechoslovak male canoeists
Olympic canoeists of Czechoslovakia
Possibly living people
Canoeists from Prague